Ascalon is an unincorporated community in St. Louis County, Missouri, United States located just south of St. Ann. It sits at an elevation of 656 feet (200 m).

References

Unincorporated communities in St. Louis County, Missouri
Unincorporated communities in Missouri